The 2022 Jacksonville Sheriff special election was held on August 23, 2022, to elect the next sheriff of Jacksonville, Florida, United States. Incumbent sheriff Pat Ivey, previously the undersheriff, was appointed interim sheriff by Governor DeSantis after his predecessor Mike Williams resigned. Ivey was not a candidate in the election. As no candidates received more than 50% of the vote in the general election, a runoffwas held on November 8, 2022, coinciding with the regularly scheduled elections in Florida. T.K. Waters ultimately won the race with 55% of the vote compared to Burton's 45%.

General election

Candidates

Advanced to runoff
Lakesha Burton (Democrat), assistant chief of the Jacksonville Sheriff's department
T.K. Waters (Republican), chief of investigations of the Jacksonville Sheriff's department

Eliminated in general
Wayne Clark (Democrat), former assistant chief of the Duval County School Police Department (endorsed Burton)
Tony Cummings (Democrat), Army Military Police Corps veteran, candidate for sheriff in 2015 and runner-up for sheriff in 2019
Ken Jefferson (Democrat), retired police officer, former WJXT crime and safety analyst and runner-up for sheriff in 2015

Withdrawn
Mathew Nemeth (Republican), chief of special events of the Jacksonville Sheriff's department (endorsed Waters)

Endorsements

Debate
A televised debate was held at Jacksonville University on August 10.

Polling

Results

General election runoff

Results

References

Notes

External links
Official campaign websites
LaKesha Burton (D) for Sheriff
Wayne Clark (D) for Sheriff
Tony Cummings (D) for Sheriff
T.K. Waters (R) for Sheriff

Florida special elections
Florida sheriffs
2022 Florida elections
2022 United States local elections
Government of Jacksonville, Florida